Makhdoom Shaikh Imaduddin Ismail Qureshi(Quraishi) Asadi al Hashmi, a Suharwardi Shaikh - is one of the pioneers of Islamic preachers in Allahabad district. He is the grandson of Shaikh Bahauddin Zakaria Multani and son of Shaikh Sadruddin Arif Multani. He is commonly known as Makhdoom Shah of Bamrauli.

Birth and education
Shaikh Ismail was born in 1259 /1260 AD in Multan and was brought up in  under the guidance of his father Shaikh Sadruddin and grandfather Shaikh Bahauddin Zakaria.

He was initiated into Suharwardi order at the hands of his grandfather Shaikh Bahauddin Zakaria and trained by his father and his elder brother Shaikh Ruknuddin Abul Fateh alias Shah Rukn e Alam of Multan. Shah Ruknuddin kept his brother always with him and even in his visits to Delhi at the call of Alauddin Khalji. When Shah Ruknuddin visited Shaikh Nizamuddin Auliya, his younger brother Shaikh Ismail was with him and asked some questions from both the holy men

From Multan to Allahabad
Shaikh Ismail used to live mainly at Multan looking after the propagation and educative activities of his Khanqaah but a divine intuition propelled him to migrate and shift to Allahabad.

Before the death of his brother he had a divine intuition to move to Allahabad which was called Prayag at that time, at this distance he travelled first to Delhi where the emperor Alauddin Khalji and his successor welcomed him. From there he travelled to Allahabad via kara and settled in a village named Bamhrauli or Bamrauli (Chail, Allahabad). Thus he is considered to be one of the earliest Shaikhs who settled in the environs of the present city of Allahabad.

Adherence to Shariah
Shaikh Ismail strictly adhered to the basic tenets of Islam and did not like anything outside Shariah. He did not approve of singing, dancing in the name of Sam'a. He exhorted all to live a live of piety respecting their parents and fulfilling the duty of their creation by carrying out the responsibilities as the slave and vicegerent of Allah.

He erected a mosque over a small mound exactly on the banks of The Ganges and it is where he was laid down to rest after his departure from this world. To this day the mosque stands as it was erected by the Shaikh with he himself resting there.

After spending more than 50 years in that village and commanding respect and honour from all, he died silently in 1349 AD. He was bestowed with the honorific title as "Makhdoom-i-Hind". Since centuries all the great saints of Allahabad and environs have paid their obeisance to this great personality. No big dome and massive tomb kind of structure was erected as per his wish and no Urs rituals take place at his grave in accordance with the instructions of Shariah.He is the only Saint in whole of North India where no Urs rituals are performed.This is one of the most evident and striking evidence of saint's adherence and strict following of the Shariah.

The writer of Mirat al Asrar paid a special visit to this mosque and tomb in the reign of Shahjahan and commented " that it is a great place of Barkat".

He never allowed his name and works to be highlighted in books and discourses, so is the case that except a very few people, not all know about him even in Allahabad.

Disciples
Students from all areas including Kara, Manikpur, Zafarabad, Jaunpur, Jhunsi, Awadh, thronged to be his student. Though a lot of students were his disciples but he authorized only three students with Khailafat,One Shaikh Abdul Rahim, Second Shaikh Ali, and third Sayyid Muhammad alias Shah Karak who eventually rose to become his most famous disciple and became popularly known as Shah Karak Majzoob(Abdal) of Kara Manikpur,Allahabad who is resting at Kara and is the most famous saint of Allahabad to this day. The fact is that he is more known than his master and mentor.

Khwaja Karak is alternatively known as Khwaja Gurg of Karra/Kara.

A research is being undertaken by Khalid Bin Umar about Pargana Chail and the Sufi saints resting in Pargana Chail. The link of the short historical notices is given below with the name Wirasat - Pargana Chail.

References
 Allahabd - A Gazetteer by C H Nevill, 1911, Govt Press, United Provinces.
 Akhbar al Akhyar by Shaikh Abdul Haq Muhaddith Dehlavi, 16th Century. Urdu Edition 1990.
 Manba al Ansaab by Sayyid Muin al Haqq Jhoonsvi, Manuscript, British Library - India Office Collections, London.
 Asral al Makhdumein by Shaikh Karim Yar, 1893, Fatehpur.
 Mirat al Asrar by Shaikh Abdul Rahman Chishti, 1648, Printed Maktaba Jam e Noor, Delhi 1997.
 Tarikh Aina e Awadh by Sayyid Shah Abul Hasan Qutubi Manikpuri, 1887, Nizami Press, Cawnpore.
 Tazkirat al Makhdumeen by Khalid Bin Umar, 2004, Manuscript.

External links
  on Google blogs
 Urdustan.com
 Mosque Makhdoom Shah Bamhrauli RA on Wikimapia

1349 deaths
Scholars from Allahabad
Indian Sufis

1260 births
13th-century Indian scholars
People of Arab descent